The Smith Street Band are an Australian rock band from Melbourne, Victoria, in which the titular Smith Street can be found. The band have released five extended plays and six studio albums, No One Gets Lost Anymore (2011), Sunshine and Technology (2012), Throw Me in the River (2014), More Scared of You than You Are of Me (2017), Don't Waste Your Anger (2020) and Life After Football (2022).

History

2010–2011: Early history 
The band formed in 2010, composed of singer/lyricist/guitarist/keyboardist Wil Wagner, guitarist/backing vocalist Tom Lawson, guitarist Lee Hartney, bassist Jimi O'Loughlin and drummer/backing vocalist Chris Cowburn. Initially named Wil Wagner and The Smith Street Band — an allusion to Bruce Springsteen and the E Street Band — the band changed its name in 2011 to signify a change to a whole-band songwriting style.

Their debut EP, South East Facing Wall, was released on Jackknife Records in January 2011 and was reissued in 2013. The band's debut album, No One Gets Lost Anymore was released shortly after, in July 2011, on Poison City Records. Both albums received critical acclaim in Melbourne.

2012–2015: Poison City Records years 
In 2012, the group announced their Young Drunks tour to promote their new album, Sunshine and Technology, which ran from January through March, with Bomb the Music Industry! and The Bennies as support acts.

In March 2013, Wagner announced All Tomorrow's Shoeys, a three-day music festival held at Hobart's Brisbane Hotel. Curated by Wagner, the festival included Luca Brasi, The Bennies, Grim Fandango and Lincoln Le Fevre. Later that month, the band participated in the "Tram Sessions" program that involves the recording of live performances on Melbourne tram routes. The program organisers explained: "One day we asked ourselves, hmm, if only there was a band  name encapsulated an iconic Melbourne street which also happened to be along an iconic Melbourne route who had a typically route 86 sound... And then it came to us. The Smith Street Band!"

In August 2013, the Don't Fuck with Our Dreams EP was released. The EP's title track was inspired by the events prior to a show from the Young Drunks tour in Byron Bay, New South Wales, Australia, in which the guitarist from The Bennies was the victim of a near-fatal stabbing. The song was performed to end the band's show at The Fest event in Gainesville, Florida, US in late 2013.

In June 2014, The Smith Street Band announced Jeff Rosenstock from Bomb the Music Industry! would produce their third album, being recorded in July 2014 in the small town of Forrest, Victoria. The album is titled Throw Me in the River and was released on 31 October 2014.

In January 2015, the band released an EP titled Wipe That Shit-Eating Grin Off Your Punchable Face, which was inspired by the actions of then-Australian Prime Minister Tony Abbott and his government, particularly its stance on asylum seekers. The EP was released on 7" vinyl and as a download, with proceeds from its sales until the end of February going to the Asylum Seeker Resource Centre. The song directly impacted sales of the band's album Throw Me in the River, which rose to number 105 on the Australian Albums Chart. At the end of January, the band toured across Australia on the 26-date Get High, See Everyone tour alongside PUP, Great Cynics and Apart From This.

2016–2021: Pool House Records, More Scared of You than You Are of Me and Don't Waste Your Anger
In November 2016, the band premiered "Death to the Lads" on Triple J, as the first single from their then-forthcoming album. A series of shows were announced as a promotional tour for the single, with bands The Nation Blue, Grim Rhythm and FOREVR. The single made it to #21 on Triple J's Hottest 100 for 2016. The following day they announced that they would be leaving Poison City Records to start their own label, Pool House Records.

In February the band sent out a series of birthday cards directing fans to a website which went live on Valentines Day and debuted the second single, "Birthdays", as well as officially announcing their fourth studio album, More Scared of You than You Are of Me, confirming that it would be released through Pool House Records and produced by Jeff Rosenstock. Exclusive retailer should be Specialist Subject Records, an independent record label and shop based in Bristol, UK. The album was promoted by Triple J in April as their feature album, and a number of solo shows by Wil Wagner  around the country, officially being released on the 7th. The band performed the entire album in full at a launch party, which was livestreamed via Facebook. An Australian album tour was announced with A.W., Ceres and Joyce Manor.

On 26 May 2017 the band performed the opening show of their More Scared of You than You Are of Me tour, and debuted a new touring line-up; adding label-mate Jess Locke and musician/long-time friend of the band Lucy Wilson.

In May 2017, the band premiered the video for their third single, "Shine", recreating AC/DC's video for "It's a Long Way to the Top (If You Wanna Rock 'n' Roll)" with the original director Paul Drane.

In June 2017, it was announced that the band would be opening for Midnight Oil at the Greek Theater in Los Angeles, alongside The Living End.

On 17 March 2018, Pool House Records held the inaugural Pool House Party festival at Coburg Velodrome in Melbourne, featuring label mates The Bennies and Jess Locke, local acts like Press Club, WAAX, and Baker Boy, and international guests Astronautalis and Signals Midwest.

In February 2019, lead singer Wil Wagner was accused of harassment and emotional abuse following the circulation on social media of emails and messages sent by Wagner, with support acts subsequently pulling out of the Smith Street Band's upcoming national tour.

In April 2020, the band announced the release of their fifth studio album, Don't Waste Your Anger. The album became the band's first to peak at number one on the ARIA Charts. The album featured more electronic elements the previous albums, showing the band's departure from their previously Punk rock sound. This makes the album sound little like its predecessors and sound like a new, more synth driven sound.

In March 2021, the band released a live unplugged album which was made up of acoustic versions of previous Smith Street Band songs and a cover of Frightened Rabbit's song "Poke".

2022: Life After Football
In October 2022, the group announced their sixth studio album, Life After Football. The album was released on 25 November 2022.

Band members

Current members
Wil Wagner – lead vocals, guitar (2010–present), keyboards (2010–2012, 2017)
Lee Hartney – guitar, backing vocals (2010–present)
Michael "Fitzy" Fitzgerald – bass guitar, backing vocals (2012–present)
Jess Locke – guitar, backing vocals (2018–present; touring member 2017–2018)
Matt Bodiam – drums (2018–present; touring member 2017–2018)

Former members
Jimi O'Loughlin – bass guitar (2010–2012)
Tom Lawson – guitar, backing vocals (2010–2012)
Chris Cowburn – drums, backing vocals (2010-2017)
Lucy Wilson – backing vocals, keyboards, percussion, acoustic guitar (2018–2021; touring member 2017–2018)

Discography

Studio albums

Live albums

EPs

Singles

Awards and nominations

AIR Awards
The Australian Independent Record Awards (commonly known informally as AIR Awards) is an annual awards night to recognise, promote and celebrate the success of Australia's Independent Music sector.

|-
| AIR Awards of 2013
|Sunshine and Technology 
| Best Independent Hard Rock or Punk Album
| 
|-
| AIR Awards of 2015
| Throw Me in the River' 
| Best Independent Hard Rock or Punk Album
| 
|-
| AIR Awards of 2018
| More Scare of You That You Are of Me| Best Independent Hard Rock or Punk Album
| 
|-

EG Awards / Music Victoria Awards
The EG Awards (known as Music Victoria Awards since 2013) are an annual awards night celebrating Victorian music. They commenced in 2006.

! 
|-
| EG Awards of 2012
| The Smith Street Band
| Best New Talent
| 
| 
|-
| Music Victoria Awards of 2015
| The Smith Street Band
| Best Live Band
| 
|rowspan="2"| 
|-
| Music Victoria Awards of 2017
| "Death to the Lads"
| Best Song
| 
|-

J Awards
The J Awards are an annual series of Australian music awards that were established by the Australian Broadcasting Corporation's youth-focused radio station Triple J. They commenced in 2005.

|-
| J Awards of 2017
| More Scare of You That You Are of Me''
| Australian Album of the Year
| 
|-

National Live Music Awards
The National Live Music Awards (NLMAs) are a broad recognition of Australia's diverse live industry, celebrating the success of the Australian live scene. The awards commenced in 2016.

|-
| National Live Music Awards of 2016
| themselves
| Live Act of the Year
| 
|-
| National Live Music Awards of 2017
| Lee Hartney (The Smith Street Band)
| Live Guitarist of the Year
|

References

External links

Official website

Folk punk groups
Musical groups established in 2010
Musical groups from Melbourne
2010 establishments in Australia
Specialist Subject Records artists